Sanford J. Greenburger Associates is a major New York literary agency. It represents a wide variety of world-renowned writers, including Franz Kafka, Jean-Paul Sartre, as well as contemporary best-selling authors, such as Dan Brown and Nelson Demille.

The agency was founded in 1932 by Sanford J. Greenburger, an agent who pioneered book scouting, and was a privately owned company until 1971. Following Greenburger's death in 1971, the agency became a partnership owned by the affiliated agents. It currently has eleven partner agents, a foreign rights director, and support staff.

Sanford J. Greenburger Associates is known as a prestige launch pad for literary agents and book editors, many of whom began their publishing careers as assistants or junior agents at the agency. Several former high-level editors and publishers have also joined the agency's staff.

References

Companies based in New York (state)
American literary agencies